The Scout and Guide movement in Cyprus is served by
 the Cyprus Scouts Association, member of the World Organization of the Scout Movement
 the Girl Guides Association of Cyprus, member of the World Association of Girl Guides and Girl Scouts
 Scouts of Northern Cyprus (Kuzey Kıbrıs Türk İzcileri) is active in the northern part of Cyprus and has strong ties to the Türkiye İzcilik Federasyonu

International Scout units in Cyprus
Also, groups of the Scout Association and Girlguiding UK are active for British Scouts at the Eastern and Western Sovereign Base Areas of Akrotiri and Dhekelia.

Ethnic Armenian Scouting

Scouting plays a role in the Armenian diaspora community on the island.